Heartbreak Tango (Spanish:  Boquitas pintadas) is a 1974 Argentine drama film, directed by Leopoldo Torre Nilsson.

It was adapted from Argentine writer Manuel Puig's 1969 novel of the same name (English: Heartbreak Tango).

In a survey of the 100 greatest films of Argentine cinema carried out by the Museo del Cine Pablo Ducrós Hicken in 2000, the film reached the 22nd position. In a new version of the survey organized in 2022 by the specialized magazines La vida útil, Taipei and La tierra quema, presented at the Mar del Plata International Film Festival, the film reached the 47th position.

Cast

 Alfredo Alcón as Juan Carlos Etchpare
 Marta Yolanda González as Nené (as Martha González) 
 Luisina Brando as Mabel Saénz 
 Raúl Lavié as Francisco Paez / Pancho 
 Leonor Manso as Antonia / La Rabadilla

See also

 List of Argentine films of 1974
 List of drama films of the 1970s

References

External links
 

1974 films
1974 drama films
Argentine drama films
1970s Spanish-language films
Films based on Argentine novels
Films directed by Leopoldo Torre Nilsson
1970s Argentine films